The Stingaree was a disreputable neighborhood of San Diego at the turn of the 20th century. The word may also refer to:

Entertainment:
Stingaree (1934 film), starring Irene Dunne and Richard Dix
Stingaree (serial), a 1915 film serial
"The Stingaree", a song from the musical The Girl Who Came to Supper
Stingaree (novel) (1905), a novel by E. W. Hornung on which the films were based

Places:
Stingaree or Stingray Bay, original name given to Botany Bay by Captain James Cook 
Stingaree Island and Stingaree Bight, in Swan Bay, Australia
Stingaree Island (see List of islands of Maryland)

Other:
Members of the ray family Urolophidae, or stingrays in general
Stingaree, one of five Queensland Maritime Defence Force Auxiliary Gunboats

See also
Captain Stingaree, a DC Comics villain